In computer graphics, a nonobtuse triangle mesh is a polygon mesh composed of a set of triangles in which no angle is obtuse, i.e. greater than 90°. If each (triangle) face angle is strictly less than 90°, then the triangle mesh is said to be acute. Every polygon with  sides has a nonobtuse triangulation with  triangles (expressed in big O notation), allowing some triangle vertices to be added to the sides and interior of the polygon. These nonobtuse triangulations can be further refined to produce acute triangulations with  triangles.

Nonobtuse meshes avoid certain problems of nonconvergence or of convergence to the wrong numerical solution as demonstrated by the Schwarz lantern. The immediate benefits of a nonobtuse or acute mesh include more efficient and more accurate geodesic computation using fast marching, and guaranteed validity for planar mesh embeddings via discrete harmonic maps.

References

See also
Triangle mesh

Computer graphics data structures
3D computer graphics
Triangulation (geometry)